Step Up For Israel was created as an international grassroots campaign to educate individuals and communities about Israel and give them the tools to defend and promote it. It is a project of Jerusalem U and chaired by renowned Middle East experts Professor Alan Dershowitz and Ambassador Dore Gold.

Goals 
Step Up For Israel aims to inform and educate people about Israel and its contribution to the world. It also aims to create awareness of the growing movement to delegitimize Israel and to motivate people to learn the facts and step up on Israel's behalf.

Film-based curriculum 
Step Up For Israel uses the medium of film to educate and engage, supplementing its visual education with moderator's guides, lesson plans and online resources offering creative ideas, topics for discussion and practical exercises and simulations. 

The Step Up For Israel curriculum is based on Jerusalem U's films Israel Inside: How a Small Nation Makes a Big Difference, Beneath the Helmet: From High School to the Home Front, Crossing the Line 2: The New Face of Anti-Semitism on Campus, and other films and clips.

Israel Inside: How a Small Nation Makes a Big Difference 
Presenting a side of Israel not so commonly shown in the international media, this unit uses animation, diagrams and original footage to illustrate the power of a people who started with nothing in the aftermath of the Holocaust and transformed a desert land to become one of the world's leading innovators in a whole range of fields.

Beneath the Helmet: From High School to the Home Front 
Based on a film presenting the real-life coming-of-age of five young Israeli soldiers, this unit discusses the challenges they face and begs comparisons with their peers in the U.S..

Crossing the Line 2 
A unit examining and analyzing the rising trend of anti-Semitic and anti-Israel activities on college campuses. Particular attention is given to BDS and how Jewish students can respond.

A Nation Reborn 
This class presents the historical, legal and religious connections between the Jewish people and its national homeland.

Other topics discussed 
 Israel's wars, from the 1947–1949 Palestine war in 1948 through to Operation Protective Edge in 2014
 The Palestinian Narrative 
 Practical techniques and tools for Israel advocacy
 Gaza: addressing the difficult questions
 The Western values that lie at the root of modern Israel

Educational products 
Step Up For Israel offers tailored educational products built on the above films for specific target audiences:

Grades 8–12 
 Israel Inside/Out
 Step Up for Israel Teen Course

Organizations 
 Step Up for Israel Mini-Series for Organizations
 Host a Screening

Adults 
 Step Up for Israel Mini-Series

Featured experts (partial list) 
 Ambassador Daniel Ayalon 
 Tal Ben-Shahar 
 Zeev Ben-Shachar
 Professor Alan Dershowitz
 Bassem Eid 
 Jessica Felber
 Sir Martin Gilbert
 Caroline Glick
 Ambassador Dore Gold 
 Malcolm Hoenlein
 Professor Mordechai Kedar
 Colonel Richard Kemp
 Alan Levine
 Professor Bernard Lewis
 Professor David Luchins
 Mira Marcus
 Elliot Mathias 
 Natalie Menaged
 Jessica Montel
 Professor Sharon Musher
 Fern Oppenheim
 Jackie Retig
 Michelle Rojas-Tal
 Roz Rothstein
 Aviva Slomich
 Chloé Valdary
 Professor Robert S. Wistrich

Campaign Chairs 
Professor Alan Dershowitz and Ambassador Dore Gold

Partners 
Over 90 organizations are listed as partners with the Step Up For Israel project. Some of the prominent partners listed are: Jewish National Fund, Hillel, Nefesh B'Nefesh and NCSY.

References

External links
 Step Up For Israel Website
 Jerusalem U Website

Zionist organizations
Alan Dershowitz